Järvevälja Landscape Conservation Area is a nature park situated in Ida-Viru County, Estonia.

Its area is 310 ha.

The protected area was designated in 1967 to protect Järvevälja Dunes (:et) and its surrounding areas. In 2017, the protected area was redesigned to the landscape conservation area.

References

Nature reserves in Estonia
Geography of Ida-Viru County